Flintstone may refer to:

 Flint, a type of stone, sometimes called flintstone
 Flintstone, Georgia
 Flintstone, Maryland
 Flintstone, Tasmania, a locality in Australia
 The Flintstones, an animated television show and related productions
 The Flintstones (1988 video game)
 The Flintstones (1993 video game), a 1993 video game based on the animated television show
 The Flintstones (pinball)
 The Flintstones (film), a 1994 live action film based on the animated television show
 Flintstones Chewable Vitamins, supplemental multivitamins for children based on the animated sitcom The Flintstones
 The Flintstones (2016 comic book)
 Flintstonization, a term coined in the book Sex at Dawn regarding the projecting of modern assumptions and beliefs onto earlier societies.

See also
 Flint (disambiguation)